MailChannels  is a cybersecurity technology company based in Vancouver, British Columbia. It provides email security, and email delivery services for web hosting providers.

MailChannels
MailChannels specializes in software and services that detect and block the sending of spam, phishing and other abusive email. Unlike most anti-spam technology providers, MailChannels positions itself as a leader in blocking abusive email at its source by installing software and services within sending networks and services such as ISPs and web hosting providers.

To combat outgoing spam, MailChannels offers customers either a cloud-based SMTP relay service or software that is installed by the customer within their network. MailChannels' software derives from the open-source web proxy software Nginx, and as such, the company makes the claim that its software is extremely scalable and robust.

MailChannels' customers include large web hosting companies, internet service providers, mailbox providers and email service providers such as Endurance International Group, SendGrid, Sherweb, and Locaweb.

Company history
The company was founded in 2004 by former engineers of ActiveState (acquired by Sophos), who created one of the first commercial spam filters.

The company's first product was an SMTP proxy that provides tar-pitting and transparent SMTP proxy functionality for inbound email filtering. At the 2007 MIT Spam Conference, the company's founder, Ken Simpson, was awarded the Best Paper award.

In 2007, MailChannels joined M³AAWG and closed a series A round led by early Microsoft employees.

In 2010, the company launched an outbound email filtering software that claims to be capable of filtering up to 30 million messages per hour, transparently in the network. Outbound email filtering involves scanning email traffic as it exits the network, identifying compromised accounts, and reducing the risk of having IP addresses blocked by receiving networks.

In 2013, the company launched a cloud-based outbound email filtering service.

In 2018, the company launched a cloud-based inbound email filtering service.

In 2022, the company decided to stop supporting Plesk for outbound email filtering.

See also
E-mail spam
Mail transport agent
Outbound spam protection
Tarpit (networking)

References

External links
MailChannels
Web Host Industry Review: MailChannels Provides Outbound Spam Filter to Web Host VPS.NET
Washington Post: Technology Aims to Bore Impatient Spammers
Network World: Tarpits deter impatient spammers
The Register: Spam: It sucks like a tarpit
O'Reilly Radar: Spamonomics 101
OnLAMP: Developing High-Performance Asynchronous IO Applications
Case study on using Mail Channels within the hosting industry

Anti-spam
Spam filtering
Technology companies established in 2004
Canadian companies established in 2004
2004 establishments in British Columbia